Murder Squad was a documentary television series broadcast in 1992, 1996 and 1997 on the British ITV network. The series followed the Metropolitan Police's murder squad as they investigate homicides in the United Kingdom's capital city, London. The series includes the gathering of forensic evidence and police interviews with suspects.

Episodes

There are 3 series of varying lengths, including 7 part series broadcast in February and March 1992, a two part special broadcast in 1996 and a 3 part series broadcast in 1997. Each episode followed a particular murder investigation in a fly-on-the-wall format through from crime to court room.

The episodes were:

Series 1

 Murder of Douglas Piper, originally broadcast 4 February 1992
 Explosion at New Cross, originally broadcast 11 February 1992
 The Murder of Noel Christopher Part 1, originally broadcast 18 February 1992
 The Murder of Noel Christopher Part 2, originally broadcast 25 February 1992
 The Missing Boy, originally broadcast 3 March 1992
 Murder of John Howard, originally broadcast 10 March 1992
 Life Sentence, originally broadcast 17 March 1992

Series 2, Two part special

 The Murder of an Unknown Man, originally broadcast 5 September 1996
 The Murder of Barry Stubbings, originally broadcast 12 September 1996

Series 3

 The Killing of Mr and Mrs Ambasna, originally broadcast 1 July 1997
 The Murder of Raymond Folks, originally broadcast 8 July 1997
 The Knife Killings, originally broadcast 15 July 1997

The series included investigations of real life crimes, following the murder squad during their investigations. The crimes included the murder of Madhavji Ambasna and his wife Raliat, an elderly couple who were murdered in April 1994 in Hounslow. Milton Wheeler whose own father was a convicted murderer was convicted of the crime by the Old Bailey in March 1995.

Production team

The original series was produced and directed by London born Robert Fleming, however the 1996 and 1997 series were produced by John Withington and directed by Paul Williams and Peter George. Robert Fleming was also known for producing the series Flying Squad that followed the elite unit of the Metropolitan Police in solving armed robberies.

References

1992 British television series debuts
1997 British television series endings
1990s British documentary television series
ITV documentaries
Television shows set in London